Indian Institute of Cartoonists is an organisation based in Bangalore that serves to promote and preserve cartooning and cartoonists in India. Founded in 2001, the institute hosts the Indian Cartoon Gallery with rotating exhibits focusing on different artists. It has organised more than one hundred exhibitions of cartoons.

Founders and Brief History 
IIC was registered as a non profitable organization under Trust act in 2001 to promote the art of cartooning in India with B. V. Ramamurthy as the Chair person, V. G. Narendra as the Managing Trustee and B.G. Gujjarappa as a member Trustee. The chief patron as Mario Miranda.
Then Governor of Karnataka, V. S. Ramadevi inaugurated the IIC at Bangalore on 8 June 2001. Seven leading cartoonists were felicitated with Lifetime Achievement Award. Mario Miranda, Pran, S.D. Padnis, Bapu, Gopulu, Yesudasan and S. K. Nadig. More than 100 cartoonists from across the country had participated in the function. R. K. Laxman was felicitated with Lifetime achievement Award in February 2002 in another function.

The Board of Trustees
(IIC as in May 2017)

Indian Cartoon Gallery

After the demise of the IIC Chairman B. V. Ramamurthy, Ashok Kheny (M.D. Nandi Infrastructure Corridor Enterprise and an ardent admirer of the cartoons) step forward as Honorary Chairman of the institute. He dedicated the Institute 5000 square feet of premises in the heart of Bangalore to establish the Indian Cartoon Gallery, first of its kind in India. The premises has a vast, tastefully designed 2000 sq. ft. of Gallery, a conference hall and a space for a Library. Since then, every month the gallery is conducting fresh cartoon exhibition of the professional as well as amateur cartoonist. Later on the gallery has been awarded by the Limca Book of Records.

Exhibitions held at the Indian Cartoon Gallery

Exhibitions : 2007

Exhibitions : 2008

Exhibitions : 2009

Exhibitions : 2010

Exhibitions : 2011

Exhibitions : 2012

Exhibitions : 2013

Exhibitions : 2014

Exhibitions : 2015

Exhibitions : 2016

Exhibitions : 2017

Exhibitions : 2018

Exhibitions : 2019

Exhibitions : 2020

Exhibitions : 2021

Exhibitions : 2022

Maya Kamath Memorial Award

The Maya Kamath Memorial Awards(MKMA) Competition for excellence in political cartoons and Best Budding Cartoonists award was started in 2008. IIC is also organising MKMA competition. These awards have been instituted by the family of late cartoonist Maya Kamath(1951-2001). The jury for selecting best cartoons for the awards includes Girish Karnad, S. G. Vasudev, B. G. Gujjarappa and Satish Acharya.

Awardees of MKMA

References

External links
 Official website
 Bangalore toons in (India Today)
 A Gallery of Laughter! (The Hindustan Times Blog)
 Tickling the funny bone (Citizen Matters, Bangalore)

Indian cartoonists
Arts organisations based in India
2001 establishments in Karnataka
Organizations established in 2001
Organisations based in Bangalore